The Parliamentary Jazz Awards in the United Kingdom are organised by the All Party Parliamentary Jazz Appreciation Group (APPJAG) at the Houses of Parliament in London. The group consists of over a hundred members drawn from across the UK political parties. The awards were the brainchild Bob Blizzard (Waveney MP), a long-time enthusiast of the jazz genre who was concerned that there was a lack of national recognition for the work of jazz performers and venues across the UK. Blizzard was involved with organising and running the awards for 11 years. Also supporting the awards are Jazz Services, Jazz UK, Jazzwise, the UK Musicians' Union jazz section, and PPL.

There are nine categories:

 Jazz Musician of the Year
 Jazz Ensemble of the Year
 Jazz Venue of the Year
 Jazz Journalist of the Year
 Jazz CD of the Year (released during the previous year by a band or musician)
 Jazz Broadcaster of the Year
 Jazz Publication of the Year
 Jazz Education Award (for a person who has contributed to jazz in education)
 Services to Jazz Award

In 2009, a special award was presented to Ronnie Scott's Jazz Club, as a tribute to the 50th anniversary of the well-known London club that year.

Winners

2021 

 Jazz Vocalist of the Year: Georgia Mancio
 Jazz Instrumentalist of the Year: Nubya Garcia
 Jazz Album of the Year: Callum Au and Claire Martin “Songs and Stories” Stunt Records
 Jazz Ensemble of the Year: KOKOROKO
 Jazz Newcomer of the Year: Jas Kayser
 Jazz Venue of the Year: Peggy’s Skylight
 Jazz Media Award: Women In Jazz Media
 Jazz Education Award: The Original UK Summer School
 Services to Jazz Award: Norma Winstone
 Lockdown Innovation Award: The Globe – Newcastle upon Tyne
 Special APPJAG Award: Digby Fairweather, Lord Colwyn

2020 

 Jazz Vocalist of the Year: Cherise Adams-Burnett
 Jazz Instrumentalist of the Year: Sarah Tandy
 Jazz Album of the Year: ‘Finding Home’ – Kate Williams Four Plus Three meets Georgia Mancio
 Jazz Ensemble of the Year: Nikki Iles Big Band
 Jazz Newcomer of the Year: Luca Manning
 Jazz Venue of the Year: PizzaExpress Jazz Club
 Jazz Media Award: Corey Mwamba “Freeness” BBC Radio 3
 Jazz Education Award: Jon Eno BEM
 Services to Jazz Award: Blow The Fuse
 Special APPJAG Award: Jazzwise

2019 

 Jazz Vocalist of the Year: Zoe Gilby
 Jazz Instrumentalist of the Year: Josephine Davies
 Jazz Album of the Year: Turas, Fergus McCreadie
 Jazz Ensemble of the Year: Ezra Collective
 Jazz Venue of the Year Jazz: Watermill Jazz, Dorking
 Jazz Newcomer of the Year: Xhosa Cole
 Jazz Media Award: Ian Mann
 Jazz Education Award: Nikki Iles
Services to Jazz Award: Cleo Laine 
APPJAG Special Award: Henry Lowther

2018 

 Jazz Vocalist of the Year: Ian Shaw
 Jazz Instrumentalist of the Year: Arun Ghosh
 Jazz Album of the Year: The Late Train, Denys Baptiste
 Jazz Ensemble of the Year: Alison Rayner Quartet
 Jazz Venue of the Year Jazz: Jazz at the Lescar, Sheffield
 Jazz Newcomer of the Year: Shirley Tetteh
 Jazz Media Award: Lance Liddle
 Jazz Education Award: Jean Toussaint
Services to Jazz Award: Jill Rodger
APPJAG Special Award: Gary Crosby OBE

2017
 Jazz Vocalist of the Year: Cleveland Watkiss
 Jazz Instrumentalist of the Year: Shabaka Hutchings
 Jazz Album of the Year: Together As One, Dinosaur
 Jazz Ensemble of the Year: Phronesis
 Jazz Venue of the Year Jazz: Scarborough Jazz Festival
 Jazz Newcomer of the Year: Nerija
 Jazz Media Award: Chris Philips
 Jazz Education Award: Tomorrow's Warriors
 Services to Jazz Award: Tony Dudley-Evans
 APPJAG Special Awards: Jim Mullen

2016
 Jazz Vocalist of the Year: Emilia Mårtensson
 Jazz Instrumentalist of the Year: Alexander Hawkins
 Jazz Album of the Year: Let It Be Told, Julian Argüelles
 Jazz Ensemble of the Year: Empirical
 Jazz Venue of the Year Jazz: Seven Jazz Leeds
 Jazz Newcomer of the Year: Binker and Moses
 Jazz Media Award: Jez Nelson, BBC Jazz on 3
 Jazz Education Award: Tommy Smith
 Services to Jazz Award: Mary Greig
 APPJAG Special Awards: Michael Connarty and Evan Parker

2015
 Jazz Vocalist of the Year: Norma Winstone
 Jazz Instrumentalist of the Year: Laura Jurd
 Jazz Album of the Year: Swamp by Partisans
 Jazz Ensemble of the Year: Engines Orchestra
 Jazz Venue of the Year: St Ives Jazz Club
 Jazz Newcomer of the Year: Peter Edwards
 Jazz Media Award: London Jazz News website
 Jazz Education Award: National Youth Jazz Orchestra
 Services to Jazz Award: Chris Hodgkins
 Special Award: Peter Ind

2014
 Jazz Vocalist of the Year  – Christine Tobin
 Jazz Instrumentalist of the Year – Arun Ghosh
 Jazz Album of the Year – Live at Cheltenham 13 Jazz Festival, Troykestra
 Jazz Ensemble of the Year – Beats & Pieces Big Band
 Jazz Newcomer of the Year – Phil Meadows
 Jazz Venue of the Year  – EFG London Jazz Festival
 Jazz Media Award – The Jamie Cullum Show
 Jazz Education Award  – Issie Barratt, National Youth Jazz Collective
 Services to Jazz Award – David Redfern
 Special Award – Chris Barber

2013
 Jazz Musician of the Year: Guy Barker
 Jazz Album of the Year: Saltash Bells, John Surman (ECM)
 Jazz Ensemble of the Year: Impossible Gentlemen
 Jazz Venue Award: The Vortex Jazz Club, London
 Jazz Journalist of the Year: Rob Adams
 Jazz Broadcaster of the Year: Mike Chadwick
 Jazz Publication of the Year: Benny Goodman's Famous 1938 Carnegie Hall Jazz Concert, Catherine Tackley –
 Jazz Education Award: Nick Smart 
 Services to Jazz Award: Stan Tracey
 Special Award: Elaine Delmar

2012
 Jazz Album of the Year: Liane Carroll, Up and Down

2011 

 Jazz Musician of the Year: Brian Kellock
 Jazz Album of the Year: Midas, John Turville
 Jazz Ensemble of the Year: Brass Jaw
 Jazz Promoter/Venue of the Year: The Hideaway (Streatham, London)
 Jazz Journalist of the Year: John Fordham
 Jazz Broadcaster of the Year: Paul Barnes
 Jazz Publication of the Year: Goin' Home: The Uncompromising Life and Music of Ken Colyer by Mike Pointon, Ray Smith, Martin Colyer
 Jazz Education Award: Ian Darrington
 Services to Jazz Award: Coleridge Goode
 Special Award: Cleo Laine

2010
 Jazz Musician: Mark Lockheart
 Jazz CD: No Messin by the Gareth Lockrane Septet
 Jazz Ensemble: the Nigel Price Organ Trio
 Jazz Venue: the Jazz Bar, Edinburgh
 Jazz Journalist: Mike Flynn
 Jazz Broadcaster: Alyn Shipton
 Jazz Publication: Jazzwise
 Jazz Educator: Kathy Dyson
 Services to Jazz Award: Brian Blane

2009
 Jazz Musician of the Year: Phil Robson
 Jazz CD of the Year: Howeird, The Sam Crockatt Quartet
 Jazz Ensemble of the Year: The Ryan Quigley Sextet
 Jazz Venue of the Year: Fleece Jazz (South East England)
 Jazz Journalist of the Year: Kevin Le Gendre
 Jazz Broadcaster of the Year: Sarah Ward
 Jazz Publication of the Year: jazzreloaded.com
 Jazz Education Award: Richard Michael
 Services to Jazz Award: Val Wilmer

2008
 Jazz Musician of the Year: Liane Carroll
 Jazz CD: The Amadeus Project – Guy Barker
 Jazz Ensemble – Empirical
 Jazz Venue: Tithe Barn, Needham, Norfolk
 Jazz Journalist: John Fordham
 Jazz Broadcaster: Helen Mayhew
 Jazz Publication: Jazz UK
 Jazz Educator: Dennis Rollins
 Services to Jazz Award: Paul Pace (of Ray's Jazz)

References

External links
 All Party Parliamentary Jazz Appreciation Group website

Awards established in 2005
British jazz
British music awards
Jazz awards
2005 establishments in the United Kingdom
Parliament of the United Kingdom